Grand Ayatollah Yasubeddin Rastegar Jooybari  (Persian:  يعسوب الدين رستگار جويباري) (born 1940) is an Iranian Twelver Shi'a Marja'.

He has studied in seminaries of Qom, Iran under Grand Ayatollah Mohammad Kazem Shariatmadari, Mohammad-Reza Golpaygani and Mirza Hashem Amoli.

He has repeatedly been arrested for his opposition against the current Iranian government, in particular Supreme Leader Khamenei. Khamenei's elevation to supreme leader was challenged by him.

Background
Ayatollah Yasub al-Din Rastgari, accused of criticizing government policies, has been arrested and detained several times. During his arrest in late February 1996, he was held in incommunicado detention, reportedly mainly in Tawhid and Evin Prisons in Tehran until July 1996. In August 1996, he was sentenced to three years imprisonment for having held a mourning ceremony for the late Grand Ayatollah Shariatmadari. He was sentenced by the Special Clerical Court after a summary trial on vaguely worded charges, in which he had no access to a lawyer.

Ayatollah Rastgari was released from prison in December 1996, but immediately afterwards was placed under house arrest in Qom. Rastgari was again arrested on April 27, 2004 and sentenced by the Special Clerical Court to four years in prison for “insulting Islam” and “causing schism” through his critical book on Sunni-Shia relations, The Reality of Religious Unity. He has reportedly been tortured while in detention and is held incommunicado without access to his family.

His two sons were arrested with him at the time. 
After publishing Rastgari's book "The Reality of Religious Unity," the book's publisher was shut down.

See also
Special Clerical Court
Grand Ayatollah Hossein-Ali Montazeri
 Abbas Mahfouzi

Notes

Bibliography
Amnesty International Report 13/24/97
Network of Concerned Historians, “Ayatollah Yasub al-Din Rastgari: detained in Iran for publishing a book on Islamic history,” 20.10.2005, http://www.let.rug.nl/nch.

External links
Website
Blog
Short biography
ISCHRO Calls for the Release of Ayatollah Rastegari
عاجل/ رسالة المرجع الرستكاري إلى خامنئي من داخل السجن

Iranian ayatollahs
Iranian Islamists
Shia Islamists
1940 births
Living people
People from Sari, Iran
People from Juybar
People who have been placed under house arrest in Iran